Orville E. Snare (July 3, 1918 – July 13, 2006) is a former Republican member of the Pennsylvania House of Representatives.

References

Republican Party members of the Pennsylvania House of Representatives
2006 deaths
1918 births
20th-century American politicians